Farmers is an unincorporated community in Ripley Township, Rush County, in the U.S. state of Indiana.

Geography

References

Unincorporated communities in Rush County, Indiana
Unincorporated communities in Indiana